Petr Gřegořek (born May 25, 1978) is a Czech professional ice hockey player who participated at the 2010 IIHF World Championship as a member of the Czech Republic National men's ice hockey team.

He previously played for HC Oceláři Třinec, HC Bílí Tygři Liberec, HC České Budějovice and HC Vsetín.

References

External links

1978 births
Living people
Czech ice hockey defencemen
People from Český Těšín
Motor České Budějovice players
HC Oceláři Třinec players
HC Bílí Tygři Liberec players
VHK Vsetín players
Sportspeople from the Moravian-Silesian Region
HC Sparta Praha players
Molot-Prikamye Perm players
Czech expatriate ice hockey players in Russia
HC Karlovy Vary players